The 1914 International Lawn Tennis Challenge was the 13th edition of what is now known as the Davis Cup. The bulk of the competition returned to the United States for the first time since 1903. The United States fell to Australasia in the final, which was played at the West Side Tennis Club in New York on 13–15 August.

Draw

Quarterfinals
Australasia vs. Canada

Great Britain vs. Belgium

Semifinals
Australasia vs. Germany

Great Britain vs. France

Final
Great Britain vs. Australasia

Challenge Round
United States vs. Australasia

References

External links
Davis Cup official website

Davis Cups by year
International Lawn Tennis Challenge
International Lawn Tennis Challenge
1910s in Queens
International Lawn Tennis Challenge
International Lawn Tennis Challenge
Forest Hills, Queens
Sports competitions in New York City
Sports in Queens, New York
Tennis tournaments in New York City
Tennis tournaments in New York (state)